The Central Coal and Iron Company was a 19th-century coal company in the western Kentucky coalfields. It was managed by the Louisville branch of the Du Pont family, including Alfred Victor's youngest son Bidermann and his son Coleman.

It was the namesake of the town of Central City, Kentucky, in Muhlenberg County.

Defunct companies based in Kentucky
Central City, Kentucky
Du Pont family